Sand Rock Peak is a mountain that overlooks Newhall and the rest of Santa Clarita Valley to the northeast.

Sand Rock Peak is part of the Santa Susana Mountains. Oat Mountain, a higher mountain, is south of Sand Rock Peak, and can be seen from there.

See also 
 Rocky Peak

References 

Santa Susana Mountains
Mountains of Los Angeles County, California
Mountains of Southern California